Hexacona armata is a species of beetle in the family Cerambycidae, the only species in the genus Hexacona.

References

Acanthocinini